The Karimnagar Municipal Corporation is the local governing body, administering the city of Karimnagar in the Indian state of Telangana. The municipal corporation is headed by a mayor and democratically elected members.

History
The Municipality status given to Karimnagar in 1941. Then it was upgraded as Karimngar Municipal Corporation on 5 March 2005 vide GONo:109.

Karimnagar Municipal Corporation is spread over an area of 50 km2. In 2019 few villages merged with the Municipal Corporation of Karimnagar. MCK is spread across two assembly constituencies. MCK covers major population of Karimnagar assembly constituency and smaller population from Manakondur assembly constituency. Karimnagar assembly constituency has 58 divisions and Manakondur has 2 divisions of MCK.  
Few more villages were planned to merge with the MCK but later it was postponed for future plans. The Telangana High Court has suggested to add the villages till Manakondur, Thimmapur, Kothapalli on the city outskirts but later this was not taken into consideration.

Demographics 
The city of Karimnagar is spread over an area of 50 km2. It has a population of more than 300,000. According to the election commission of Telangana, the city has a total of 272,692 voters for 2020 Municipal Corporation of Karimnagar elections.

Administration 
Karimnagar municipal corporation has a total of 60 divisions with an average of 4,550 voters in each. Karimnagar is headed by an elected Mayor and a Municipal Commissioner appointed by the State Government. Municipal Corporation of Karimnagar is part of the Satavahana Urban Development Authority.

Politics 
In 2014 Municipal polls MCK had elections for 50 divisions. The Telangana Rashtra Samithi (TRS) won 24 seats, INC won 14, AIMIM won 2, TDP and  BJP won one each and Independents won the remaining 8 seats. The TRS grabbed the Mayor seat with the support of AIMIM and 3 Independents. Sardar Ravinder Singh was elected as Mayor and G. Ramesh as Deputy Mayor.
 
In 2020 Municipal polls MCK had elections for 58 out of 60 divisions as two divisions were won by the TRS unanimously before the polls. After the results TRS emerged as the winner with 33 seats. TRS won 33 seats, BJP won 13, AIMIM won 6 and Independents won 8 seats. Later 8 Independents joined the TRS party making their total strength to 47 with the support of AIMIM. Y Sunil Rao was elected as Mayor and Challa Swaroopa Rani as Deputy Mayor.

Greater Karimnagar status 
Karimnagar MLA and State Minister Gangula Kamalakar requested the State Government to upgrade MCK to Greater Karimnagar Municipal Corporation (GKMC) by increasing the divisions from 50 to 60. The divisions were increased to 60 but due to low population compared with Greater Hyderabad and Greater Warangal Karimnagar remained MCK. In future there is a possibility of Greater Karimnagar by merging the municipality of Kothapalli which is 2 km from Karimnagar and villages of Bommakal, Malkapur, Chintakunta, Lakshmipur, Manakondur, Thimmapur, Durshed etc.

References 

Karimnagar
Municipal corporations in Telangana
1941 establishments in India